Eduardo Echeverría (born 23 June 1939) is a Guatemalan sports shooter. He competed in the mixed trap event at the 1976 Summer Olympics.

References

External links
 

1939 births
Living people
Guatemalan male sport shooters
Olympic shooters of Guatemala
Shooters at the 1976 Summer Olympics
Place of birth missing (living people)